Jack Branfield (born 25 October 1891) was an English footballer who played as a goalkeeper. He played professionally for Gillingham, making over 50 appearances, and was in goal for the club's first ever match in the Football League in 1920.

References

1891 births
Year of death missing
English footballers
Gillingham F.C. players
People from Gillingham, Kent
Association football goalkeepers